Bankend is a village in Dumfries and Galloway, Scotland. It is located near Lochar Water, the civil parish Caerlaverock and the villages of Blackshaw, Glencaple and Shearington. In 1961 it had a population of 79.

Isle Tower

Isle Tower is a 16th-century ruined tower house, that was a property of the Maxwell family. It was built around 1565 and is B listed.

Bankend Bridge
Bankend Bridge is a road bridge that carries the B725 road across the Lochar Water. It was completed in 1813 and is B listed.

Caerlaverock Parish Memorial
Caerlaverock Parish Memorial is a stone war memorial that was unveiled in 1956 by Mrs J Telfer of Glencaple to commemorate people who lost their lives in World War I and II. There is 33 names on the memorial, 21 from World War I and  12 from World War II.

See also
List of places in Dumfries and Galloway
List of listed buildings in Caerlaverock, Dumfries and Galloway

References

Villages in Dumfries and Galloway